Hengqin Headquarters Tower 2 is a supertall skyscraper under construction in Zhuhai, Guangdong, China. Construction started 2013 buildings.

See also
List of tallest buildings in China

References

Buildings and structures in Zhuhai
Skyscrapers in Guangdong
Skyscraper office buildings in China